Enrique San Pedro, S.J. (born Enrique San Pedro y Fonaguera) (March 9, 1926 - July 17, 1994) was a Cuban-born prelate of the Roman Catholic Church.  He served as the fourth bishop of the Diocese of Brownsville in Texas from 1991 until his death in 1994.  He previously served as an auxiliary bishop of the Diocese of Galveston-Houston from 1986 to 1991.

Biography

Early life 
Enrique San Pedro was born March 9, 1926, in Havana, Cuba, the second child and oldest son of  María Antonia Fornaguera and Enrique San Pedro y Xiques. His siblings were: Silvia, Berta and Javier San Pedro y Fornaguera.

San Pedro studied at Colegio de Belén and entered the novitiate of the Jesuits at Escuela Apostólica y Seminario Menor in Sagua la Grande, in Cienfuegos, Cuba, on December 7, 1941. After two years of novitiate, he underwent four years of Greek and Latin studies in Havana and in Salamanca, Spain, where he received a master's degree in classical literature. These studies were followed by three years of Philosophy at  Comillas Pontifical University in Spain.  San Pedro was sent to Manila, Philippines, to study Mandarin, Tagalog and Vietnamese languages. While there, he also taught social sciences and Latin at the Jesuit school in the Philippines. San Pedro also studied theology in Baguio, Philippines.

Priesthood 
San Pedro was ordained a priest by Bishop William Brasseur for the Society of Jesus on March 18, 1957.  He continued his studies at the Pontifical Biblical Institute in Rome and received his doctorate in sacred scripture from the University of Innsbruck, Austria. He spoke seven languages, wrote two books and some professional articles and book reviews.

San Pedrothen went to what was then South Vietnam and taught classes at Pius X Pontifical College in Da Lat. He also worked at the Student Center of St. Francisco Javier in Huế. In March 1975, at the end of the Vietnam War, he was expelled from the country by the new Vietnamese government.

San Pedro came to the United States in the late 1970s. He went to Miami to visit his parents and stayed as assistant pastor at St. Raymond's Parish, teaching classes at Belen Jesuit Preparatory School in Miami periodically from 1977 to 1986. He was a visiting professor at St. Vincent de Paul Regional Seminary in Boynton Beach, Florida and at the Jesuit seminary in the Dominican Republic (1976–1977). San Pedro requested to his Jesuit superiors to be assigned again as a missionary; they sent him to Suva, Fiji Islands (1978–1980).

Auxiliary Bishop of Galveston-Houston 
On April 1, 1986, San Pedro was appointed by Pope John Paul II as an auxiliary bishop of the Diocese of Galveston-Houston and titular bishop of Siccesi.  He was consecrated on June 29, 1986, by then Bishop Joseph Fiorenza. His co-consecrators were Archbishop Edward McCarthy and Bishop Agustin Roman.  San Pedro's motto was taken from II Corinthians, I2, 15: Libentissime impendam et super impendar (Most gladly I will spend myself and be spent for your sakes).

Coadjutor Bishop and Bishop of Brownsville 
San Pedro was appointed on August 13, 1991, by John Paul II as the coadjutor bishop of the Diocese of Brownsville.  He was installed as bishop on September 26, 1991.  On November 30, 1991, San Pedrosucceeded as the fourth bishop of Brownsville.

Death and legacy 
Enrique San Pedro died in Miami on July 17, 1994, at age 68.

In Brownsville, Texas, the diocese named its homeless shelter after him, the Bishop Enrique San Pedro Ozanam Center. The Bishop San Pedro Spanish Club, a service club in Belen Jesuit Preparatory School in Miami is named after him. He is buried at Our Lady of Mercy Cemetery in Miami.

References

External links
 Bishop Enrique San Pedro website
 Catholic Hierarchy bio
 Episcopologio de la Iglesia Católica en Cuba bio 
 Roman Catholic Diocese of Brownsville

Episcopal succession

1926 births
1994 deaths
20th-century Cuban Roman Catholic priests
20th-century Roman Catholic bishops in the United States
Cuban Jesuits
Cuban emigrants to the United States
Pontifical Biblical Institute alumni
Comillas Pontifical University alumni
Jesuit bishops
Jesuit missionaries
Cuban expatriates in Spain
Cuban expatriates in the Philippines